Central Motion Picture Corporation (中央電影事業股份有限公司, or CMPC 中影 in short) is a Taiwanese movie studio. It was established in 1954 as a state-owned media organisation by the then Kuomintang of Taiwan. It has produced movies by Taiwanese directors like Ang Lee, Hou Hsiao-hsien, Tsai Ming-liang, and Edward Yang. CMPC was privatised in 2005 when the film production and distribution business ceased, but resumed in 2009 after a change in management.

External links

References 

Taiwanese film studios
Entertainment companies established in 1954
1954 establishments in Taiwan